In mathematical logic, a theory can be extended with
new constants or function names under certain conditions with assurance that the extension will introduce
no contradiction. Extension by definitions is perhaps the best-known approach, but it requires
unique existence of an object with the desired property.  Addition of new names can also be done
safely without uniqueness.

Suppose that a closed formula 

 

is a theorem of a first-order theory .

 

and adding a new axiom 

.

Such a theory can also be conservatively extended by introducing a new functional symbol:

Suppose that a closed formula  is a theorem of a first-order theory , where we denote .

Shoenfield states the theorem in the form for a new function name, and constants are the same as functions
of zero arguments.  In formal systems that admit ordered tuples, extension by multiple constants as shown here 
can be accomplished by addition of a new constant tuple and the new constant names 
having the values of elements of the tuple.

See also
 Conservative extension
 Extension by definition

References

Mathematical logic
Theorems in the foundations of mathematics
Proof theory